Blood into Wine is a 2010 documentary film about the Northern Arizona wine industry focusing on Maynard James Keenan and Eric Glomski and their Caduceus brand wine.  It was released in February 2010 theatrically and on DVD and Blu-ray in September 2010. A soundtrack featuring remixes of Keenan's band Puscifer heard in the film was released, called Sound into Blood into Wine.

Cast
 Maynard James Keenan
 Eric Glomski
 Milla Jovovich
 Tim Heidecker
 Bob Odenkirk
 Tim Alexander
 Eric Wareheim

References

External links 
 
 
 
 

2010 films
2010 documentary films
American documentary films
Documentary films about business
Documentary films about wine
Films set in Arizona
2010s English-language films
2010s American films